Nico Maier (born 2 July 2000) is a Swiss professional footballer who plays as a midfielder for Wil on loan from Young Boys.

Club career 
After having signed his first professional contract mid-2020–21 season, Nico Maier made his professional debut for BSC Young Boys on the 22 April 2021, coming on as a substitute in a 2–1 Swiss Super League away win against FC Zürich, while Young Boys had just became national champions.

Only three days later, he made his first debut for Bern, delivering his first assist on Mambimbi's opening goal, helping his team achieving a 2–1 win against FC Sion.

On 14 June 2022, Maier joined Wil on a season-long loan.

Honours
Young Boys
Swiss Super League:  2020–21

References

External links

2000 births
Footballers from Bern
Living people
Swiss men's footballers
Switzerland youth international footballers
Association football midfielders
BSC Young Boys players
FC Wil players
Swiss 1. Liga (football) players
Swiss Super League players
Swiss Promotion League players
Swiss Challenge League players